Ust-Tyrym is a rural locality (a settlement) in Gornozavodsky District, Perm Krai, Russia. The population was 61 as of 2010. There are 11 streets.

Geography 
Ust-Tyrym is located 23 km southeast of Gornozavodsk (the district's administrative centre) by road. Kusye-Alexandrovsky is the nearest rural locality.

References 

Rural localities in Gornozavodsky District